Campbell Grobman Films is an American film and television production company founded by Christa Campbell and Lati Grobman in 2011. It is responsible for the feature-length films Texas Chainsaw 3D, Straight A's, The Iceman, Reality Show, and A Case of You as well as documentaries The Resort and Brave Miss World.

Productions
Campbell-Grobman Films produces both documentaries and feature-length films.

Films

References

Film production companies of the United States
Entertainment companies established in 2011